The Alamo Fire was a wildfire in San Luis Obispo County, in California in the United States. The fire started on July 6, 2017 and destroyed , including one home. It was fully contained on July 19, 2017.

The fire
The fire was located off California State Route 166 near Twitchell Reservoir in San Luis Obispo County in California. The fire started on July 6, 2017. It quickly grew in size thanks to favorable weather conditions, with record-breaking temperatures, very low humidity, and high winds driving the fire's expansion. By July 9, 2017, it had become the largest active fire in California. The fire was finally contained on July 19, 2017. it caused the evacuation of approximately 200 homes.  1664 firefighters fought the fire. One home was destroyed and one additional building was damaged. The cause of the fire remains under investigation.

See also
2017 California wildfires

References

2017 California wildfires
Wildfires in Santa Barbara County, California
Wildfires in San Luis Obispo County, California
July 2017 events in the United States